The West Santa Ana Branch Transit Corridor is a planned light rail line, mostly following the Pacific Electric's historic West Santa Ana Branch, connecting Downtown Los Angeles to the City of Artesia and other cities in southeastern Los Angeles County.

Overview

The Los Angeles County Metropolitan Transportation Authority (Metro) has $4 billion in funds available for construction planned to begin in 2022. The plan included in the Measure M transportation funding measure is to build improvements in two stages.

In June 2017, Metro issued a Request for Proposals to study alternatives for this new LA Metro Rail route. Metro has narrowed the options to two alternatives and are currently preparing to publish the Draft EIS/EIR for public comment. The draft EIS/EIR is planned to be released in 2020.

The project's timeline is expected to be accelerated under the Twenty-eight by '28 initiative.

The environmental impact report released in 2021 set an estimated cost of $8.6 billion for the line.

Proposed routings and modes
The West Santa Ana Branch Transit Corridor project is proposed as a  light rail transit line that would connect downtown Los Angeles to Artesia. Along the route, it would also serve the communities of Vernon, Huntington Park, Bell, Cudahy, South Gate, Downey, Paramount, Bellflower and Cerritos in the southeast area of the county.

The southern portion route, east and south of Slauson, leaves the A Line corridor via the former Pacific Electric Whittier Line, continues south on a former BNSF rail line (Florence/Salt Lake to Paramount/Rosecrans), and then transitions to the old Santa Ana right of way (south of Paramount/Rosecrans). These corridors are owned by the Ports of Los Angeles/Long Beach and Metro, requiring minimal property acquisition.

The northern alignment through Downtown Los Angeles is being studied as a possible underground light rail transit route. Six options were proposed. , two options were being considered (both of which would connect to the southern alignment by paralleling the A Line between Washington and Slauson stations, as well as part of an existing freight rail line along Randolph Street):

Alameda Street (Alternative E): A subway under Alameda, passing through the Arts District and connecting to the L Line at Little Tokyo before continuing to Los Angeles Union Station.
Downtown Transit Core (Alternative G): Would deviate westward from the Alameda route in the Arts District and continue downtown via a subway, terminating at either 7th Street/Metro Center or Pershing Square.

By March 2018, Cerritos had opted out of the project, leaving the southern terminus at Pioneer. In November 2018, Metro removed the Blue Line stations north of Slauson from the study area, citing redundant service and expedited travel times as the prime reasons.

In 2019, Metro announced that as part of its design analysis, it would study opening the line in two stages, with the initial opening $1 billion segment running from Pioneer Station in Artesia north to Slauson Station on the Blue Line, with the remainder of the $3 billion route into downtown built as phase two. Metro staff were "optimistic" that it would be feasible to build the line to Slauson by 2028 with existing Measure M funds. Metro was also studying public-private partnerships that could accelerate the construction schedule of the entire line. The service is not planned to interline with the A Line to 7th Street/Metro Center due to operational constraints. Under the proposed plans, design for the initial segment would be complete by 2021 and construction would begin in 2022.

Route Selection: Alternative: E
By 2022, the Metro Board backed the Union Station option as the northern terminus. Construction on the segment south of Slauson was expected to begin construction in 2023 with an estimated opening of 2033 to 2035. The second phase north of Slauson to Union Station is expected to be completed in 2043 at the earliest.

Stations

Extension into Orange County

Metro is evaluating an optional station in Cerritos at Bloomfield Avenue (just north of the Los Angeles-Orange county line) to facilitate a possible future extension into Orange County; it would eventually connect to the under-construction OC Streetcar, which also uses part of the Pacific Electric WSAB right-of-way.

References

External links 
 Measure R
 West Santa Ana Branch Transit Corridor

Transportation in Los Angeles
Los Angeles County Metropolitan Transportation Authority
Public transportation in Los Angeles
Public transportation in Los Angeles County, California
Proposed railway lines in California
2033 in rail transport